was a vice admiral in the Imperial Japanese Navy.

Biography
Tōgō was born in what is now Kagoshima Prefecture as the younger son of a samurai of Satsuma Domain.  He was the nephew of Fleet Admiral Tōgō Heihachirō.

Tōgō was a graduate of the 13th class of the Imperial Japanese Naval Academy in 1886. He was sent to Great Britain in August 1900 as part of the Japanese crew for the new battleship , returning in February 1901. He received his first command, that of the ex-Chinese gunboat Soko, in October 1901. He was promoted to commander in October 1902. From April to December 1903 he was assigned as aide-de-camp to Prince Higashifushimi Yorihito.

At the start of the Russo-Japanese War, Tōgō was assigned as executive officer on the cruiser . After the end of the war, from January 1905, he was executive officer in the battleship  and was given command of the cruiser  in December the same year. From February to September 1907 he was captain of the cruiser . Promoted to captain in September 1907. He was captain of the battleship  to July 1908 and captain of the cruiser  from September to December of the same year. From September 1910 to December 1912, he was naval secretary for the Government-General of Taiwan.

Tōgō was then promoted to rear admiral on December 1, 1912 and served as commandant of the Naval Artillery School from December 3 to December 1914. During World War I, he served as Commander of the Interim Southern Islands Defense Unit from October 1915 to December 1916. He was promoted to vice admiral on December 1, 1916 and assigned command of the Chinkai Guard District to December 1918. He went on the reserve list on August 1, 1920 and retired on December 14, 1931. He died in 1942.

Honors
1895 -  Order of the Rising Sun, 6th class
1905 -  Order of the Sacred Treasure, 4th class
1915 -  Order of the Rising Sun, 2nd class
1920 -  Order of the Sacred Treasure, 1st class

References

External links
 

1867 births
1942 deaths
Imperial Japanese Naval Academy alumni
Imperial Japanese Navy admirals
People from Satsuma Domain
Military personnel from Kagoshima Prefecture
Japanese military personnel of the First Sino-Japanese War
Japanese military personnel of the Russo-Japanese War
Japanese military personnel of World War I
Members of the Government-General of Taiwan